For marching bands, this is a list of ISSMA Marching Band finalists grouped by class entered. The Indiana State School Music Association, Inc. (ISSMA) is a scholastic music association, with a mission to provide educationally evaluated music performance activities for the students and teachers of the state of Indiana. ISSMA sponsors, among other events, the Marching Band festivals and competitions leading to the ISSMA Band State Finals. State Finals used to take place at the RCA Dome until 2008, when the location changed to Lucas Oil Stadium and has taken place there since then. Ten bands out of twenty are selected from a Semi State site to compete for the State Champion title. In 2015, eleven bands were chosen to advance to Class C State Finals when two bands tied for tenth place.

1973

Class C

Class B

Class A

1974

Class C

Class B 

6 Princeton Community High School
Princeton, Indiana

Class A

1981

Class D

Class C

Class B

Class A

2005

Class D

Class C

Class B

Class A

2006

Class D

Class C

Class B

Class A

2007

Class D

Class C

Class B

Class A

2009

Class D

Class C

Class B

Class A

2010

Class D

Class C

Class B

Class A

2011

Class D

Class C

Class B

Class A

2012

Class D

Class C

Class B

Class A

2013

Class D

Class C

Class B

Class A

2014

Class D

Class C

Class B

Class A

2015

Class D

Class C

Class B

Class A

2016

Class D

Class C

Class B

Class A

2017

Class D

Class C

Class B

Class A

2018

Class D

Class C

Class B

Class A

2019

Class D

Class C

Class B

Class A

2021

Class D

Class C

Class B

Class A

2022

Class D

Class C

Class B

Class A

See also
 Tournament of Bands
 List of marching bands
 Western Band Association

References